Tui Min Hoi is an area and a village of Sai Kung District, Hong Kong, located in the vicinity of Sai Kung Town.

Administration
Tui Min Hoi is a recognized village under the New Territories Small House Policy.

History
Tui Min Hoi was originally called Tsiu Lung. It was established in the early 19th century as a scattered coastal Hakka village.

The houses at Nos. 5 & 6 Tui Min Hoi form a pair of semi-detached village houses. They were built in 1933, replacing an earlier village house.

References

External links

 Delineation of area of existing village Tui Min Hoi (Sai Kung) for election of resident representative (2019 to 2022)
 Antiquities Advisory Board. Pictures of Nos. 5 & 6 Tui Min Hoi

Villages in Sai Kung District, Hong Kong